Piqa (Aymara for a mass of maize prepared to make chicha, Hispanicized spelling Piga) is a mountain in the Andes on the border of Bolivia and Chile, west of the Salar de Uyuni.

On the Bolivian side Piqa lies in the Potosí Department, Daniel Campos Province, Llica Municipality, Canquella Canton, and on the Chilean side it belongs to the Tarapacá Region. One of the nearest mountains is Ch'alla Qullu north-east of it.

References

See also
List of mountains in the Andes

Mountains of Chile
Mountains of Potosí Department
Landforms of Tarapacá Region